The prime minister of Armenia is the head of government and most senior minister within the Armenian government, and is required by the constitution to "determine the main directions of policy of the Government, manage the activities of the Government and coordinate the work of the members of the Government." Also, according to the constitution, the prime minister heads the Security Council, which prescribes the main directions of the country's defense policy; thus, the prime minister is effectively the commander-in-chief of the Armed Forces of Armenia. Under the new 2015 constitution, the prime minister is the most powerful and influential person in Armenian politics. The prime minister is appointed by the president of Armenia upon the vote of the National Assembly. The prime minister can be removed by a vote of no confidence in Parliament. In the constitutional referendum held in 2015, citizens voted in favor of transferring Armenia into a parliamentary republic.

The office of prime minister was first established in 1918 with the foundation of the First Republic of Armenia. It vanished when the First Republic of Armenia was incorporated into the Transcaucasian Socialist Federative Soviet Republic. When Armenia regained its independence, the office of prime minister was reintroduced.

Nikol Pashinyan is the current prime minister. He took the office on 8 May 2018 following the resignation of Serzh Sargsyan.

List of heads of government of Armenia

Republic of Armenia (1918–1920)
Prime ministers

Transcaucasian Socialist Federative Soviet Republic (1922–1936)

Armenian Soviet Socialist Republic (1936–1991)

Armenia (1991–present)

Notes

     α.    Assassinated while in office in the 1999 Armenian parliament shooting.

     β.    Died of heart attack while in office.

References

External links
Historical Overview – Former Prime Ministers – The Government of Armenia

Armenia
 
Lists of political office-holders in Armenia